Tutankhamun is a 2016 adventure-drama serial produced by ITV and Tall Story Pictures which is based on the discovery of Tutankhamun's tomb by Howard Carter, directed by Peter Webber from a screenplay by BAFTA award-winning writer Guy Burt.

Plot 
Archaeologist Howard Carter (Max Irons) stumbles upon evidence of an undiscovered tomb of one of Egypt's forgotten Pharaohs, Tutankhamun. His peers, however, dismiss the idea, save for one man: the wealthy Lord Carnarvon (Sam Neill), a born gambler and thrill-seeker, who agrees to fund Carter's digs.

Cast 
 Max Irons as Howard Carter
 Sam Neill as Lord Carnarvon
 Susan Danford as Lady Carnarvon
 Amy Wren as Lady Evelyn Herbert
 Catherine Steadman as Maggie Lewis
 Nicolas Beaucaire as Pierre Lacau
 Jonathan Aris as Herbert Winlock
 Rupert Vansittart as Flinders Petrie
 Vincent Grass as Gaston Maspero
 Anthony Higgins as Theodore Davis
 Leon Clingman as Arthur Mace
 Vere Tindale as Harry Burton
 Adam Neill as Arthur Callender

Episodes

Home media 
The series was released by ITV on DVD on 7 November 2016. The soundtrack by Christian Henson is available on CD and streaming services.

Reception
The Guardian found the series "not 100% historically accurate, ... It’s just a bit of fun." and recommended it for fans of Downton Abbey.

The Daily Telegraph also commented on the lack of historical accuracy of the series, which portrayed an affair between Carter and Lady Evelyn, the Telegraph quoting the 8th Earl of Carnarvon as saying "there was no romance, it just did not happen that way".

References

External links 
 Official ITV page
 
 Video of composer Christian Henson overseeing a real-time recording session in AIR Studios for the Tutankhamun soundtrack
 Gramophone article about the video

2016 British television series debuts
2016 British television series endings
2010s British drama television series
ITV television dramas
Television series about the history of Egypt
2010s British television miniseries
Historical television series
Television series by ITV Studios
English-language television shows
Films directed by Peter Webber